The Lost. The Sick. The Sacred. is Inhale Exhale's debut album which was released on November 21, 2006 through Solid State Records. The album was originally recorded with Andy Levy, was originally set to be released on October 3, 2006. But due to him leaving, it was re-recorded with different lyrics and new vocalist, Ryland Raus. Because of the departure, it was pushed back to November 21.

On the booklet inside the case there are three pictures: a broken heart, a cross with a snake wrapped around it (as seen on the cover), and the ten commandments. Each represent the three parts of the album name. The lost being the broken heart, the sick being the cross and snake, and the sacred being the ten commandments.

The lost represents the frailty of human beings who feel confused about their beliefs or themselves in general. The sick represents the literal physical deterioration we experience as part of life. The sacred represents the power of God who says that life is worth living.

Track listing
"Redemption" - 3:40
"By Grace" - 3:21
"Frail Dreams & Rude Awakenings" - 3:11
"Dance All Night" - 2:47
"A Call To The Faithful" - 3:50
"Touch Of Deception" - 3:29
"Your Walls... My Words" - 2:58
"Tonight We Die Together" - 3:39
"Sons Of Tomorrow (To Noah James)" - 2:35
"Rose Among The Ashes" - 2:20
"The Lost. The Sick. The Sacred." - 4:37

References

2006 debut albums
Inhale Exhale albums
Solid State Records albums
Albums produced by Travis Wyrick